Revolutions per minute (abbreviated rpm, RPM, rev/min, r/min, or with the notation min−1) is a unit of rotational speed or rotational frequency for rotating machines.

Standards 
ISO 80000-3:2019 defines a unit of rotation as the dimensionless unit equal to 1, which it refers to as a revolution, but does not define the revolution as a unit.  It defines a unit of rotational frequency equal to s−1.  The superseded standard ISO 80000-3:2006 did however state with reference to the unit name 'one', symbol '1', that "The special name revolution, symbol r, for this unit is widely used in specifications on rotating machines."

A corresponding but distinct quantity for describing rotation is angular velocity, for which the SI unit is the radian per second.

Although they have the same dimensions (s−1), hertz (Hz) and radian per second (rad/s) are two different units and are used to measure two different but proportional ISQ quantities: frequency and angular frequency (angular speed, magnitude of angular velocity) respectively. The conversions between a frequency  and an angular velocity  are:

Thus a disc rotating at 60 rpm is said to have an angular speed of 2π rad/s and a rotation frequency of 1 Hz.

The International System of Units (SI) does not recognize rpm as a unit. It defines units of angular frequency and angular velocity as rad s−1, and units of frequency as Hz, equal to s−1.

Examples 
On many kinds of disc recording media, the rotational speed of the medium under the read head is a standard given in rpm.
Modern air turbine dental drills can rotate at up to  (13.3 kHz).
The second hand of a conventional analog clock rotates at 1 rpm.
Audio CD players read their discs at a precise, constant rate (4.3218 Mbit/s of raw physical data for 1.4112 Mbit/s (176.4 KB/s) of usable audio data) and thus must vary the disc's rotational speed from 8 Hz (480 rpm) when reading at the innermost edge, to 3.5 Hz (210 rpm) at the outer edge.
DVD players also usually read discs at a constant linear rate. The disc's rotational speed varies from 25.5 Hz (1530 rpm) when reading at the innermost edge, to 10.5 Hz (630 rpm) at the outer edge.
A baseball thrown by a Major League Baseball pitcher can rotate at over  (41.7 Hz); faster rotation yields more movement on breaking balls.
A power generation turbine (with a two-pole alternator) rotates at 3000 rpm (50 Hz) or 3600 rpm (60 Hz), depending on country – see AC power plugs and sockets.
The exhaust note of V8, V10, and V12 F1 cars has a much higher pitch than an I4 engine, because each of the cylinders of a four-stroke engine fires once for every two revolutions of the crankshaft.
Computer hard drives typically rotate at  –  (90 Hz – 120 Hz), the most common speeds for the ATA or SATA-based drives in consumer models. High-performance drives (used in fileservers and enthusiast-gaming PCs) rotate at  –  (160 Hz – 250 Hz), usually with higher-level SATA, SCSI or Fibre Channel interfaces and smaller platters to allow these higher speeds, the reduction in storage capacity and ultimate outer-edge speed paying off in much quicker access time and average transfer speed thanks to the high spin rate. Similar to CD and DVD media, the amount of data that can be stored or read for each turn of the disc is greater at the outer edge than near the spindle; however, hard drives keep a constant rotational speed so the effective data rate is faster at the edge (conventionally, the "start" of the disc, opposite to a CD or DVD).
Floppy disc drives typically ran at a constant 300 rpm or occasionally 360 rpm (a relatively slow 5 Hz or 6 Hz) with a constant per-revolution data density, which was simple and inexpensive to implement, though inefficient. Some designs such as those used with older Apple computers (Lisa, early Macintosh, later II's) were more complex and used variable rotational speeds and per-track storage density (at a constant read/record rate) to store more data per disc; for example, between 394 rpm (with 12 sectors per track) and 590 rpm (8 sectors) with Mac's 800 kB double-density drive at a constant 39.4 kB/s (max) – versus 300 rpm, 720 kB and 23 kB/s (max) for double-density drives in other machines.
Gas turbine engines rotate at tens of thousands of rpm.
A Flywheel energy storage system works at  –  (1 kHz – 3 kHz) range using a passively magnetic levitated flywheel in a vacuum. The choice of the flywheel material is not the most dense, but the one that pulverises the most safely, at surface speeds about 7 times the speed of sound.
A typical 80 mm, 30 CFM computer fan will spin at  –  (43 Hz – 50 Hz) on 12 V DC power.
A millisecond pulsar can have near  (833 Hz).
A turbocharger can reach  (4.8 kHz), while  –  (1 kHz – 3 kHz) is common.
 A supercharger can spin at speeds between or as high as  –  (833 Hz – 1083 Hz)
Molecular microbiology – molecular engines.

See also 
Constant angular velocity (CAV) – used when referring to the speed of gramophone (phonograph) records
Constant linear velocity (CLV) – used when referring to the speed of audio CDs
Radian per second
Rotational speed
Compressor map
Turn (geometry)
Idle speed
Overspeed (engine)
Redline
Rev limiter

References 

Units of frequency
Units of angular velocity